The 2022 Bucknell Bison football team represented Bucknell University as a member of the Patriot League during the 2022 NCAA Division I FCS football season. The Bison, led by fourth-year head coach Dave Cecchini, played their home games at Christy Mathewson–Memorial Stadium.

Previous season

The Bison finished the 2021 season with a record of 1–10, 0–6 Patriot League play to finish in last place.

Schedule

Game summaries

Towson

at VMI

at Central Michigan

Lafayette

at No. 9 Holy Cross

at Yale

at Lehigh

Colgate

No. 24 Fordham

at Georgetown

Marist

References

Bucknell
Bucknell Bison football seasons
Bucknell Bison football